Desi Magic is an unreleased Indian romantic comedy film, directed by Mehul Atha and produced by Ameesha Patel and Kuunal Goomer under the banner of Ameesha Patel Productions. It stars actors Ameesha Patel, Esha Gupta, Zayed Khan and Sahil Shroff. The film has been in post production since 2014 and since 2015 its release was delayed.

Plot
Sonia Saxena (Ameesha Patel), a recently-known fashion designer, who is about to launch her new clothing line "Desi Magic", seems to have the perfect life. But things change when she meets Kunal Grewal (Zayed Khan), who decides to present his best friend Sahil Mehra (Sahil Shroff). All goes well until Sahil also decides to present his girlfriend Mahi Deol, without imagining that both women are look-alikes.

Cast 
 Ameesha Patel as Sonia Saxena / Mahi Deol Twins
 Esha Gupta as Sonia's rival
 Zayed Khan as Kunal Grewal
 Sahil Shroff as Sahil Mehra
 Randhir Kapoor as Ashok Saxena  (Father of Sonia and Mahi)
 Lillete Dubey as Mrs. Saxena  
 Ravi Kishan as Davidoff
 Rajat Rawail as Kimtee

Production

Development 
Actress Ameesha Patel will be making her debut as a film producer with this film under her production house, Ameesha Patel Productions. According to her, creating a production house was the idea of her co-producer Kuunal Goomer, who persuaded her to set up a company with him which aimed at making good films.

Casting 
This is the first time that Patel will be doing a double role for a film. Regarding her character, she told in an interview that in this film, she will be playing two characters of totally opposite nature.

Filming 
Principal photography began in August 2013 and the film has been shot in Mumbai and Punjab. The film was also shot in Venice, Budapest and Dubai. 
The film's release has been pushed back several times, due to delay in the shooting schedules.

The filming is reported as completed on 19 January 2019.

Post Production

Soundtrack 

The film introduces DJ Aqeel as a film score composer. He has recreated the song Ek Do Teen. The new track has been voiced by Shreya Ghoshal. However, Shreya has later also rendered a new version of the same song for the movie Baaghi 2 released in 2018. Apart from that, Ghoshal has also sung a slow number composed by Lalit Pandit.

References

External links
 

Unreleased Hindi-language films
Films shot in Venice
Films shot in Dubai
Films shot in Georgia (country)
Films shot in Budapest
Films shot in Punjab, India
Films shot in Mumbai
Indian romantic comedy films